The NA35 experiment was a particle physics experiment that took place in the North Area of the Super Proton Synchrotron (SPS) at CERN. It used a streamer chamber with comprehensive hadronic and electromagnetic calorimetry. This experiment was used to observe the properties of nucleus-nucleus collisions at 60 and 200 GeV/nucleon, to understand the degree of stopping and thermalization, determine the energy densities achievable in those conditions, and to measure other related properties and quantities.

The first signature of quark–gluon plasma was observed by the NA35 experiment in 1995.

The NA35 experiment was approved on 03 February 1983 and completed on 31 May 1999. It was succeeded by the NA49 experiment. The spokesperson for the experiment was Peter Seyboth.

See also
 NA34/3 experiment
 NA36 experiment
 NA49 experiment
 NA61 experiment
 List of SPS experiments

References

External links
 Results from NA35
 CERN-NA-35 experiment record on INSPIRE-HEP

CERN experiments
Particle experiments